The Will Rogers–Wiley Post Memorial Seaplane Base  is a seaplane base in Washington state. It is owned and operated by the city of Renton and located on Lake Washington at the northwest corner of Renton Municipal Airport, inside the latter's perimeter fence. The base was named after actor Will Rogers and aviator Wiley Post who took off from the water landing at the beginning of a trip to Alaska, during which they were ultimately killed in an air crash.

Gallery

External links 
 
 WSDOT Pilot's Guide (Note: Photo has incorrect arrow pointing to Seaplane Ramp location on the east side of runway, ramp is to the west of main runway next to the dock)
 
 

Airports in King County, Washington
Seaplane bases in the United States